Simona Manzaneda (1770-1816) was a Bolivian heroine. Together with Vicenta Juaristi Eguino and Úrsula Goyzueta, she is counted as one of the three heroines of the Bolivian War of Independence.

References 
 Roca, José Luis (2007). Ni con Lima ni con Buenos Aires: la formación de un estado nacional en Charcas. Plural editores.  .

1770 births
1816 deaths
Bolivian rebels
19th-century Bolivian people
People of the Bolivian War of Independence
Women in 19th-century warfare